Choristoneura ferrugininotata is a species of moth of the family Tortricidae. It is found in the north-western Himalayas in India.

References

Moths described in 1968
Choristoneura